Enrique Bautista (15 July 1934 – 25 July 2005) was a Filipino sprinter. He competed in the men's 200 metres at the 1960 Summer Olympics.

References

External links
 

1934 births
2005 deaths
Athletes (track and field) at the 1960 Summer Olympics
Filipino male sprinters
Olympic track and field athletes of the Philippines
Place of birth missing
Athletes (track and field) at the 1958 Asian Games
Medalists at the 1958 Asian Games
Asian Games medalists in athletics (track and field)
Asian Games gold medalists for the Philippines
Asian Games bronze medalists for the Philippines